The Rookery is a former country house in the village of Tattenhall, Cheshire, England.  The house was originally owned by the Orton family.  It was reconstructed in 1909 for F. W. Wignall of the Tate & Lyle company.  It has since been used as a nursing home.  The house is timber-framed on a stone plinth.  It is recorded in the National Heritage List for England as a designated Grade II listed building.

See also

Listed buildings in Tattenhall

References

Country houses in Cheshire
Houses completed in 1909
Timber framed buildings in Cheshire
Grade II listed buildings in Cheshire
Grade II listed houses